Out on a Limb is a 1950 Walt Disney Animation Studios short featuring Donald Duck and Chip 'n' Dale.

Plot
Donald, acting as a tree surgeon, walks up to a tree. He climbs a ladder, cuts a branch and puts tar on it, when an acorn falls on his beak. He looks up and sees Chip and Dale putting acorns in their tree. As a prank, Donald cuts their branch and puts tar on it to cause Dale to stop picking acorns. But things get sticky when Dale passes the tar to Chip. Just then, Chip tries to get off Dale and it worked. Donald then makes a joke with his leaf cutter to make the chipmunks think it's a scary bird, frightening them, so they tried to hurt it but to no avail. Donald then makes his cutter an acorn cracker which causes the chipmunks to get mad, so they put a rock on the cutter, smashing Donald into the ground. Chip goes to check where he meets an angry Donald. A chase ensues between them as Donald runs after them, until the chipmunks hide in some leaves. Donald gets his grass cutter, which not only cuts the leaves but also the chipmunks' ears. Donald eventually ends up getting an electric shock on the high-voltage wires and falls on the leaves. Chip 'n' Dale then put the tar on Donald, causing him to turn himself into a "leaf monster", and the chipmunks laugh in triumph, only to accidentally get their hand glued together when they shake their tar-covered hands.

Voice cast
 Donald Duck: Clarence Nash 
 Chip: Jimmy MacDonald
 Dale: Dessie Flynn

Home media
The short was released on December 11, 2007, on Walt Disney Treasures: The Chronological Donald, Volume Three: 1947-1950.

References

External links 
 

1950 short films
1950 animated films
1950s American animated films
1950s English-language films
American animated short films
Films about ducks
Films about rodents
Films directed by Jack Hannah
RKO Pictures short films
RKO Pictures animated short films
Chip 'n' Dale films
Donald Duck short films